Donald Forster (1934 – August 8, 1983) was a Canadian academic. He was president of the University of Guelph, and was appointed president of the University of Toronto just before his death.

Born in Toronto, Ontario, he was a graduate of the University of Toronto and of Harvard University. Later, he was a professor of economics in the department of political economy at the University of Toronto. He was also a vice-president and provost. From 1975 to 1983, he was president of the University of Guelph.

He died in 1983 at St. Michael's Hospital in Toronto after suffering a heart attack.

References

External links 

 Donald Frederick Forster archival papers held at the University of Toronto Archives and Records Management Services

1934 births
1983 deaths
Presidents of the University of Guelph
Harvard University alumni
People from Toronto
University of Toronto alumni
Academic staff of the University of Toronto